Homa Arjomand (born 1952) is an Iranian political activist, resident in Canada, where she is a member of the International Campaign against the Sharia Court and the Director of Children First Now.

She has received the "Humanist of the Year" award from Humanist Canada.

External links
Homa Arjomand, Speech on "Emerging Issues in Women’s Equality – A look at Sharia Law"

Canadian feminists
Canadian humanists
1952 births
Living people
Worker-communism Unity Party of Iran politicians
Iranian communists